San Pedro de Jujuy is the second most populated city in the province of Jujuy, Argentina. It lies in the southeast of the province, by National Route 34, within the valley of the San Francisco River, about 45 km east of the provincial capital San Salvador de Jujuy.

The area has a humid subtropical climate that favours crops such as sugarcane and tobacco, which are the basis of the regional economy.

References

 

Populated places in Jujuy Province
Cities in Argentina
Argentina
Jujuy Province